Alice Olivia Dellal (born 29 July 1987) is a British-Brazilian model and photographer.

Biography 
Daughter of Brazilian model mother, Andrea, and Iraqi-British father, Guy Dellal, Alice is an heiress and granddaughter to the property tycoon, Jack Dellal who was a Baghdadi Jewish billionaire.

Her brother, Alex Dellal, runs east London gallery 20 Hoxton Square, and her sister, Charlotte Olympia Dellal, is the creator behind Charlotte Olympia. Her first cousins include actresses Jemima Kirke and Lola Kirke. She was educated at Bedales School, Hampshire.

In 2008, she was the face of Mango and the body of the Agent Provocateur collection. Known for her half-shaved head and her punk/rock look, she is Mario Testino's muse.

In 2011, she was chosen by Karl Lagerfeld to be the new face for the new 'boy' bag Chanel campaign.

Alice is also a drummer for Thrush Metal, an all-female band of four best friends who not only decided to start their own band, but also created their own record label, Sweet Dick Music. Thrush Metal was formed by Dellal with two other models, Emma Chitty (bassist) and Laura Fraser (vocalist), and Isabella Ramsey (guitar), niece of the Earl of Dalhousie.
She now works as a photographer.

References

External links
 
 
 Interview with Alice Dellal – Madame Figaro

1987 births
Living people
Place of birth missing (living people)
Brazilian people of British descent
Brazilian people of Iraqi-Jewish descent
British people of Iraqi-Jewish descent
British people of Brazilian descent
People of Brazilian-Jewish descent
Brazilian female models
British female models
Brazilian Jews
British Jews
Brazilian expatriates in England
People from Rio de Janeiro (city)